Cape Buor Khaya, (Mys Buor-Khaya) is a headland in the Laptev Sea.

Geography
It is located between the Buor-Khaya Gulf on the west and the Yana Bay on the east. It is a conspicuous headland and has an 11 m high light on a framework tower.

The sea in the area surrounding the cape is frozen for about nine months every year and often clogged with ice floes. On its eastern side there is a long semi-submerged landspit known as Kosa Buor-Khaya.

Administratively the Buor-Khaya Cape belongs to the Sakha Republic (Yakutia) of the Russian Federation.

Climate
The area has a subarctic climate (Dfc) bordering on a tundra climate (ET).

References

External links
 Location
 Geographical data
 Kosa Buor-Khaya

Buor-Khaya
Landforms of the Sakha Republic
Buor-Khaya